The 2014 PSL Season was the second season of the Philippine Super Liga (PSL). There were two conferences for the season – the All-Filipino and the Grand Prix – for both women’s and men’s division.

The All-Filipino Conference was held between May 16, 2014 to July 26, 2014 with the Generika-Army Lady Troopers and the PLDT Home TVolution-Air Force Power Attackers emerging as champions for the Women’s and Men’s divisions, respectively.

The champions of the Grand Prix Conference - the Petron Blaze Spikers (women's) and the Cignal HD Spikers (men's) - will represent the Philippines in the 2015 AVC Club Volleyball Championships.

During the pre-season, the league held its first annual draft for the Women’s Division on April 2, 2014 with Aleona Denise Santiago selected as the first overall pick by the Petron Blaze Spikers.

2014 draft (Women’s Division only)

Draft rules
Prior to the draft, each of the teams submitted a list of ten protected players as part of their official roster for the 2014 PSL All-Filipino Conference. Players that were not included in the list will be released and placed in the pool of available players – along with the incoming rookies – for the draft. Teams were limited to a maximum of twelve players.

The inaugural draft was held on April 2, 2014 at the NBA Café at SM Aura in Taguig and involved only the Women’s Division.

Draft selections

First round

Second round

Third round

Fourth round

All-Filipino Conference

Women's Division

Classification round (May 16, 2014 to July 9, 2014):

|}

Playoffs (July 13, 2014 to July 26, 2014):

Final standing:

Men’s Division

Classification round: (May 16, 2014 to July 23, 2014):

|}

Playoffs (July 26, 2014):

Final standing:

Awards

Grand Prix Conference

Women's Division

Classification round (October 18, 2014 to November 26, 2014):

|}

Playoffs (November 28–30, 2014):

Final standing:

Men’s Division

Classification Round (October 22, 2014 to November 19, 2014):

|}

Playoffs (November 20–28, 2014):

Final standing:

Awards

Venues

All-Filipino Conference:
Cuneta Astrodome
University of San Carlos gymnasium

Grand Prix Conference:
Smart Araneta Coliseum – opening day
Cuneta Astrodome
Santo Domingo Coliseum
Muntinlupa Sports Complex
Alonte Sports Arena

Brand ambassador
 Gretchen Ho

Broadcast partner
Solar Sports

References

Philippine Super Liga
PSL
PSL